Robert Francis is a British politician and businessman who has served as Chairman of the Council of the Isles of Scilly since 2018. He, along with his wife Teresa, have owned the Star Castle hotel since 2003 and the Holy Vale vineyard since 2009. Previous to this, he built a hotel on St Martin's which opened in 1989, and ran the Polurrian Hotel in Mullion, on the Lizard Peninsular.

Electoral record

2017 Council of the Isles of Scilly election 

|}

2021 Council of the Isles of Scilly election

References 

Living people
British hoteliers
People from the Isles of Scilly
21st-century British politicians
21st-century British businesspeople
Chairs of the Council of the Isles of Scilly

Year of birth missing (living people)